The 1973 Gillette Cup was the eleventh Gillette Cup, an English limited overs county cricket tournament. It was held between 30 June and 1 September 1973. The tournament was won by Gloucestershire County Cricket Club who defeated Sussex County Cricket Club by 40 runs in the final at Lord's.

Format
The seventeen first-class counties, were joined by five Minor Counties: Bedfordshire, Dorset, Durham, Staffordshire and Wiltshire. Teams who won in the first round progressed to the second round. The winners in the second round then progressed to the quarter-final stage. Winners from the quarter-finals then progressed to the semi-finals from which the winners then went on to the final at Lord's which was held on 1 September 1973. The tournament was notable for Durham (then a minor county) defeating Yorkshire. In doing so, Durham became the first ever minor county to beat a first class county in this competition.

First round

Second round

Quarter-finals

Semi-finals

Final

References

External links
CricketArchive tournament page 

Friends Provident Trophy seasons
Gillette Cup, 1973